The 2009–10 North American winter saw several major blizzards affect the Northeastern United States. It refers to winter as it occurred across the North American continent from late 2009 to early 2010. While there is no well-agreed-upon date used to indicate the start of winter in the Northern Hemisphere, there are two definitions of winter which may be used. Based on the astronomical definition, winter begins at the winter solstice, which in 2009 occurred on December 21, and ends at the March equinox, which in 2010 occurred on March 20. Based on the meteorological definition, the first day of winter is December 1 and the last day February 28. Both definitions involve a period of approximately three months, with some variability.

Seasonal forecasts 

On October 15, 2009, the National Oceanic and Atmospheric Administration's Climate Prediction Center issued its U.S. Winter Outlook. Due to a strengthening El Niño, winter weather was expected to be affected by this. Warmer-than-average temperatures were favored across much of the western and central U.S., especially in the north-central states from Montana to Wisconsin. Below-average temperatures were expected across the Southeast and mid-Atlantic from southern and eastern Texas to southern Pennsylvania and south through Florida. Above-average precipitation is expected in the southern border states, especially Texas and Florida. Recent rainfall and the prospects of more should improve current drought conditions in central and southern Texas. The rest of the country fell into the equal-chance zone.

Events

Mid-December blizzard 

On December 16, meteorologists identified a storm forming in the Gulf of Mexico. It produced record rainfall in regions of Texas and had the potential to strengthen as it moved through Georgia and Florida and further north. Weather models accurately predicted that this storm would meet with cold air while retaining its heavy precipitation. By the afternoon of December 19, the large, low pressure region had moved off the East coast, intensifying and bringing heavy snow to the major Mid-Atlantic cities. Blizzard warnings were issued in Washington, D.C., Baltimore, and Long Island.

Christmas Eve storm complex 

Just before Christmas of 2009, an area of low pressure formed in eastern Texas, and began to track on a northwards track. Interacting with cold air from the west, snow broke out on the western side of the system, stretching from Oklahoma to southern Minnesota. The storm grew to an immense size, stretching from the Gulf Coast to the Upper Midwest, spreading a line of thunderstorms in the Deep South as well late on December 24.

January winter storms

Late January winter storm 
In late January, a winter storm affected the upper parts of the Southeast, specifically in the Carolinas. Originating from a weak area of low pressure that had formed from a large upper-level low in the Central U.S late on January 29, it began to track to the east, and due to interacting with cold air that was in place over the Northeast, snow began to form around the North Carolina–South Carolina border, with heavy snowfall beginning to creep northwards. The storm began to accelerate, and began to crank out the last burst of snowfall along the affected areas before moving offshore. Snowfall was even reported as far north as southern New Jersey, and a thick band of ice accumulations of up  was also reported further south.

Early February blizzards 

Two blizzards occurred in very close proximity in the Northeast during a timespan from February 5–11. This put many areas in the Northeast towards their snowiest winter on record. Both were rated on the Regional Snowfall Index, a Category 3 for the first, and a Category 2 for the latter. While having very similar snow totals in its aftermaths, the origins were very different.

The first blizzard developed out of a large upper-level low moving into the Southwestern United States, drawing a huge amount of moisture with it. It began to track towards the east, and then merged with an incoming weaker system from the north, on February 5, the two systems phased together, resulting in a band of heavy snow across Illinois, Indiana, Ohio, and Pennsylvania. That evening, the northern system's energy was absorbed into the main southern circulation, promoting fast intensification. Heavy snow subsequently developed over the Mid-Atlantic states as the storm's center tracked across North Carolina towards the Atlantic Coast. An antecedent and nearly-stationary upper-level trough over the Maritime Provinces of Canada served to block the storm system from following the traditional northeast track into New England. Instead, during the AM hours of February 6, the storm center slowed its northeasterly movement as it continued to deepen east of Virginia Beach, before it eventually was forced eastward. The blocking pattern was reflected on the storm's snowfall map by a sharp northern gradient in northern New Jersey and by the axis of heaviest snow running WNW-ESE through Maryland and Delaware (opposed to the SW-NE pattern found from most nor'easters). Only moderate accumulations reached the southern suburbs of New York City, with no more than light snow falling in the city itself. Upstate New York and New England were spared from this system, receiving little more than isolated snow flurries in southern sections. Easterly winds and onshore flow contributed to light snow accumulations of less than one inch in Boston, Cape Cod, and parts of coastal Rhode Island. It eventually dissipated by February 7.

Less than two days after this storm had left the East Coast, another significant snowstorm pummeled nearly the same areas, throwing off many people and delaying cleanup efforts from the first storm. This storm began as a classic "Alberta clipper", starting out in Canada and then moving southeast, and finally curving northeast while rapidly intensifying off the New Jersey coast, forming an eye, something that a blizzard in 2005 had done (ironically 10 years later, another severe blizzard did the same). The National Weather Service, in an interview with The Baltimore Sun's weather reporter Frank Roylance, likened this storm to a Category 1 hurricane. Forecasters told Roylance that "Winds topped 58 mph over part of the Chesapeake Bay, and 40 mph gusts were common across the region as the storm's center deepened and drifted slowly along the mid-Atlantic coast".

In total, the back-to-back snowstorms produced record snowfall amounts in some areas and even pushed areas towards their snowiest season on record. They were also mentioned in the media, with the first blizzard receiving unofficial names like "Snowmageddon", "Snowpocalypse" and such, with the latter receiving an unofficial name of "Snoverkill".

Late February nor'easter 

Near the end of the month, another blizzard struck parts of New England, New York, New Jersey, and Pennsylvania. This storm was a complex combination of multiple systems, including an upper air low from the northern Great Plains states, and a surface low from the Gulf Coast states. As the surface low tracked northeast from the coast of North Carolina, the upper air low transferred its energy to it, eventually enabling the new storm to undergo rapid intensification near the shore of eastern Long Island. A strong blocking regime of high pressure over the Canadian Maritime provinces prevented the storm system from exiting to the east. This resulted in a cutoff low (not influenced by the predominant jet stream currents), which took a highly unusual track, retrograding west into New York state before looping back out to sea.

See also

 Global storm activity of 2010
 2010 Northern Hemisphere summer heat waves

References 

 
2009 meteorology
Winter
2010 meteorology
Winter
North American winters